Ardozyga prisca is a species of moth in the family Gelechiidae. It was described by Edward Meyrick in 1904. It is found in Australia, where it has been recorded from New South Wales.

The forewings are fuscous, very finely irrorated with whitish. The stigmata are faintly darker or quite obsolete, with the plical rather beyond the first discal. The hindwings are pale grey, somewhat darker posteriorly.

References

Ardozyga
Moths described in 1904
Taxa named by Edward Meyrick
Moths of Australia